Yamen Ben Zekry (born October 6, 1979, in Tunis) is a Tunisian footballer who was play for Al-Salmiya SC in Kuwait.

Attributes
Ben Zakry is a good defender, but Ruud Krol, Zamalek's manager, claims he lacks pace.

International career
He is an occasional Tunisian international and played his first match on 24 March 2007.

References

External links
 

1979 births
Living people
Tunisian footballers
Tunisian expatriate footballers
Tunisia international footballers
CS Hammam-Lif players
Club Africain players
Zamalek SC players
Riffa SC players
SC Bastia players
Al-Shamal SC players
Al Salmiya SC players
Expatriate footballers in Egypt
Expatriate footballers in Qatar
Expatriate footballers in Bahrain
Expatriate footballers in France
Expatriate footballers in Libya
Expatriate footballers in Kuwait
Egyptian Premier League players
Qatar Stars League players
Association football defenders
Tunisian expatriate sportspeople in Kuwait
Kuwait Premier League players
Tunisian expatriate sportspeople in Bahrain
Tunisian expatriate sportspeople in Qatar
Tunisian expatriate sportspeople in Libya
Tunisian expatriate sportspeople in Egypt
Tunisian expatriate sportspeople in France